Vojtech Milošovič (born 2 October 1992) is a Slovak football goalkeeper who currently plays for II. Liga club Skalica.

Club career

DAC Dunajská Streda
Milošovič made his professional Fortuna Liga debut for DAC Dunajská Streda against Ružomberok on 20 May 2016.

References

External links
 FC DAC 1904 Dunajská Streda profile
 
 Eurofotbal profile
 Futbalnet profile

1992 births
Living people
Slovak footballers
Association football goalkeepers
ŠK Senec players
FC DAC 1904 Dunajská Streda players
FK Senica players
Slovak Super Liga players
Sportspeople from Trnava